Moussa Doumbia (born 15 August 1994) is a professional footballer who plays as an attacking midfielder and left winger for Ligue 2 club Sochaux. Born in Ivory Coast, he plays for the Mali national team.

Club career

On 16 June 2014, Doumbia signed a four-year contract with Rostov of the Russian Premier League.

On 25 February 2017, Doumbia signed for Arsenal Tula on loan for the rest of the 2016–17 season.

On 27 June 2018, he signed a four-year contract with French club Reims.

On 29 June 2022, Doumbia joined Sochaux on a three-year deal.

International career
Doumbia made his debut for Mali on 29 June 2014 in a 3–1 victory over China in Shenzhen.

In a match against Ivory Coast in October 2016, Doumbia lost consciousness following a collision with an Ivorian player. Serge Aurier, player of the Ivory Coast national team, helped save Doumbia's life by putting two fingers inside his mouth as a makeshift tracheal tube to keep his airways open, preventing him from suffocating.

Career statistics

Club

International

Scores and results list Mali's goal tally first, score column indicates score after each Doumbia goal.

References

External links
 Rostov Profile

1994 births
Living people
People from Bouaké
Association football midfielders
Citizens of Mali through descent
Malian footballers
Mali international footballers
Ivorian footballers
Ivorian people of Malian descent
Sportspeople of Malian descent
Russian Premier League players
Ligue 1 players
Ligue 2 players
FC Rostov players
FC Arsenal Tula players
Stade de Reims players
FC Sochaux-Montbéliard players
Malian expatriate footballers
Expatriate footballers in Russia
Malian expatriate sportspeople in Russia
Expatriate footballers in France
Malian expatriate sportspeople in France
2017 Africa Cup of Nations players
2019 Africa Cup of Nations players
2021 Africa Cup of Nations players
People with epilepsy